Good Souls Better Angels is the 14th studio album by American singer-songwriter Lucinda Williams, released on April 24, 2020, by Highway 20 Records and Thirty Tigers.

Announced in February 2020, the album was preceded by the track "Man Without a Soul", a critique of Donald Trump, which earned Williams a Grammy Award nomination for Best American Roots Song. The album received widespread critical acclaim, and was nominated for the Grammy Award for Best Americana Album.

Critical reception

 AnyDecentMusic? sums up critical consensus as an 8.1 out of 10, with 18 reviews. Jon Breen of The Irish Times gave the release five out of five stars, writing that it "punch[es] with a dark, almost biblical vengeance but also, importantly, balance vitriol with solace, hellfire with a hand in need" and praising its timely lyrics. In American Songwriter, Hal Horowitz gave the release 4.5 out of five stars, writing that it is arguably her most intense album, ending his review: "By the end of the hour, you'll be wiped out. This is a devastatingly in your face, take no prisoners presentation from Williams and her band that will leave most serious listeners shattered and perhaps shaking. Few albums connect with this much pure emotional fury, let alone those from artists well into their 60s." Dan Nailen of Inlander writes that this album has Williams' most direct lyrics but suffers from several songs having the same tempo.

Track listing
Credits adapted from the album's liner notes. All songs written by Tom Overby and Lucinda Williams, except where noted.
"You Can't Rule Me" (Memphis Minnie adaptation from the original composition) – 4:02
"Bad News Blues" – 4:37
"Man Without a Soul" – 5:31
"Big Black Train" – 5:28
"Wakin' Up" (Williams) – 4:44
"Pray the Devil Back to Hell" – 5:38
"Shadows & Doubts" – 6:01
"When the Way Gets Dark" – 3:27
"Bone of Contention" (Williams) – 4:05
"Down Past the Bottom" (Greg Garing) – 3:21
"Big Rotator" – 5:20
"Good Souls" – 7:35

Personnel
 Lucinda Williams – acoustic and electric guitar, vocals, production
 Mark T. Jordan – organ on "Big Black Train" and "Shadows & Doubts"
 Ray Kennedy – mixing, production
 Brian Lucey – mastering
 Stuart Mathis – guitar, violin
 Butch Norton – drums, percussion
 Tom Overby – production
 David Sutton – bass guitar

Charts

See also
List of 2020 albums

References

External links
Press release from Highway 20 Records
Interview with Williams in The Guardian, April 24, 2020
 
Lucinda Williams Official Website

2020 albums
Albums produced by Lucinda Williams
Lucinda Williams albums
Thirty Tigers albums